This is a list of the cities and towns (i.e. human settlements) in the Republic of Ghana.

List of settlements in Ghana by population

Top ten largest metropolitan areas

See also

 Top Largest Cities and Towns in Ghana By Population : https://helpinghana.com/index.php/2018/01/28/870/
 Urban planning in Africa: Ghana

Notes

References

External links

 
Ghana, List of cities in
Cities
Ghana